The black-bellied sandgrouse (Pterocles orientalis) is a medium large bird in the sandgrouse family.

The nominate race breeds in Iberia, northwest Africa, the Canary Islands,  Turkey, Iran, Cyprus and Israel. The eastern form P. o. arenarius (Pallas, 1775) is found in Kazakhstan, western China and northern Pakistan. It is a partial migrant, with central Asian birds moving to the Pakistan and northern India in winter.

Taxonomy
The black-bellied sandgrouse was formally described by the Swedish naturalist Carl Linnaeus in 1758 in the tenth edition of his Systema Naturae. He placed it with all the other grouse-like birds in the genus Tetra and coined the binomial name Tetra orientalis. The black-bellied sandgrouse is now placed with 13 other species in the genus Pterocles that was introduced in 1815 by the Dutch zoologist Coenraad Jacob Temminck. The genus name combines the Ancient Greek pteron meaning "wing" with -klēs meaning "notable" or "splendid".

Two subspecies are recognised:
 P. o. orientalis (Linnaeus, 1758) – Canary Islands, Iberian Peninsula, Morocco to west Iran
 P. o. arenarius (Pallas, 1775) – Kazakhstan to south Iran and Afghanistan, east to northwest China

Description
The male has a grey head, neck, and breast. The underparts are black and the upperparts are golden-brown with darker markings. There is a thin black border around the lower breast, and a chestnut throat patch. This sandgrouse has a small, pigeon like head and neck, but a stocky compact body. It has long pointed wings and a fast direct flight. The white underwings and black belly make this species easy to identify while in flight. Flocks fly to watering holes at dawn.

The female has browner, more finely marked upperparts, including the head and the breast. The underparts and breast band are identical to the male. The eastern race is paler and heavier than orientalis. Males have yellower upperparts and greyer underparts than the western form. Females are whiter below, but often inseparable. The call is a soft chowrrr rrrr-rrrr.

Distribution and habitat
This gregarious species breeds on dry open plains and similar habitats, but unlike the pin-tailed sandgrouse, it avoids areas completely lacking in vegetation. Its nest is a ground scrape into which three greenish eggs with cryptic markings are laid. Both sexes incubate, but only the male brings water.

References 

 Pheasants, Partridges and Grouse by Madge and McGowan, 

black-bellied sandgrouse
Birds of Europe
Birds of North Africa
Birds of the Canary Islands
Birds of Central Asia
Birds of Western Asia
Birds described in 1758
Taxa named by Carl Linnaeus